Gangadharanpillai Soudaminithankachi Pradeep (born 15 May 1972) is an Indian television personality and a public intellectual.

Personal life
He was born to retired headmaster P. K. Gangadharan Pillai and Late Soudamini Thankachi. He is most notable for appearing on Aswamedham, being featured in the Limca Book of Records. He is also  notable for appearance in program named Oru Nimisham aired by All India Radio (Aakashavani). He is also a professional snake n ladder player and a state level carrom and the author of 5 books. He was a contestant in the reality show 'Malayalee House' aired in Surya TV which as he confessed later, was one of the worst ventures he ever took in life. He has also directed a film, Swarna Malsyangal.

Television

As Host

Other shows
Malayalam
Oru Kodi as Participant
Manyamahajanagale as Judge
Comedy Stars season 2 as celebrity judge
Yours truly as Guest
Charithram enniloode as Guest
Comedy Super Night 2 as Guest
 Ente Deivam as Guest
Oru Nimisham as Participant
Onnum Onnum Moonu as Guest
Manassil Oru Mazhavillu as Guest
Malayalee House as Participant

Filmography
 Varum Varunnu Vannu (2003)
 Swarna Malsyangal (2019) as Director

References

External links
 GS Pradeep, Times of India
 Gulf Times on GS Pradeep
 Actor Anoop Chandran on GS Pradeep, Samayam News
 Mammootty does audio launch for Grandmaster Pradeep, Mathrubhumi
 GS Pradeep on Manorama

Male actors in Malayalam television
Indian male television actors
Living people
1972 births
Male actors from Thiruvananthapuram